Going is a surname. Notable people with the surname include:

Ben Going (born 1985), American video blog personality
Charles Buxton Going (1863–1952), American engineer
Joanna Going (born 1963), American actress
John Going (1872-19??), American politician and member of the Mississippi House of Representatives
KL Going (born 1973), American author
Shaun Going, Canadian construction engineer charged with terrorism
Sid Going (born 1943), New Zealand rugby union footballer